Desecration of graves involves intentional acts of vandalism, theft or destruction in places where humans are interred: this includes body snatching. It has long been considered taboo to desecrate or otherwise violate graves or grave markers of the deceased, and in modern times it has been prohibited by law. Desecration is defined as violating something that is sacred.

History

Theft
One form of grave desecration is grave robbery. In Egypt many of the tombs in the Valley of the Kings were robbed and looted of valuables. Papyrus scrolls from 2000 BC detail accounts of looting. The accounts also spell out the punishment that thieves received. The sentence varied from the removal of the thief's ears or nose. One punishment was execution.

In China the 2nd century text Lüshi Chunqiu advised mourners to plan simple burials to discourage looting. Many Chinese were buried with valuables, including jade burial suits. In modern China, grave robbing continues.

Body snatching
Illegal body snatching from graves provided cadavers for sale to medical schools for dissection during anatomy demonstrations. Because of the taboo and theft of corpses the dissection of corpses was often carried out in secret. Body snatching was practiced by resurrectionists in the United Kingdom until the Anatomy Act 1832. In the United States the practice fed into the myth of Night Doctors. Many cemeteries installed gates and fences.

Vandalism

Graves have historically been the target for vandalism desecration. In the mid-1850s, the villagers of Silwan were paid £100 annually by the Jews in an effort to prevent the desecration of graves on the Mount of Olives.

In modern times people continue desecrating grave sites. Occasionally the vandalism-desecration is religiously motivated. Jewish cemeteries are occasionally targets for vandalism.

In some cases the desecration is racially motivated, like in the 2004 case of two white teens who desecrated the grave of James Byrd, Jr (a black man who was dragged to death) in Jasper, Texas. The teens were charged with criminal mischief after scrawling profanities on a steel plate and knocking over his grave marker.

Grave reuse

The United Kingdom Parliament passed the Burial Act 1857. Concerns arose that due to rapidly expanding cities because of the industrial revolution, burial graves were reused too quickly. The offense of disturbing a burial included in the Burial Act 1857 was based on the belief that a grave was to be undisturbed for eternity. Section 25 of the Burial Act 1857 made it unlawful in England and Wales to disturb human burials without a license or on ground consecrated by the rites of the Church of England, without the permission of the church.

Cemetery relocation
Cemeteries may also be moved so that the land can be reused for transportation structures. In some countries it is forbidden to move a cemetery. In Alberta, Canada, for instance, the Cemetery Act expressly forbids the relocation of cemeteries or the mass exhumation of marked graves for any reason whatsoever.

Urinating on someone's grave
As a form of great disrespect to the dead, a person urinates on the decedent's grave. In 17th century Churchyard-Väki tradition One was expected to proceed with quiet reverence in a cemetery. According to Väki folklore people could be punished by "angered beings" or "fall sick" for simply urinating in a graveyard.

Law
In many cases it is against the law to deface or desecrate grave sites or human remains. These include removing gravestones, leaving trash, disturbing, or tampering with a gravesite. People are also not allowed to open any repository of human remains or cover over or destroy. In many cases these are felonies. For instance NY Penal Law § 145.23: Cemetery desecration involves attempts to: vandalize, spray paint, or steal from places that are used for human interment.

According to United States legal case Dangerfield v. Williams, 26 App. D.C. 508 (D.C. Cir. 1906) as long as people recognize that an area serves as a graveyard it remains a sacred place, even if there are no new burials and the graves are neglected.

See also
 List of ways people dishonor the dead

References

External links
 Grave desecration at Kawaiahao cemetery

Burial monuments and structures
Archaeological features
Crime
Archaeological theft
Organized crime activity